Leodan Pezo (born 1 November 1993) is a Peruvian boxer. He competed in the men's lightweight event at the 2020 Summer Olympics.

References

External links
 

1993 births
Living people
Peruvian male boxers
Olympic boxers of Peru
Boxers at the 2020 Summer Olympics
People from Ucayali Region
Pan American Games medalists in boxing
Pan American Games bronze medalists for Peru
Boxers at the 2019 Pan American Games
Medalists at the 2019 Pan American Games
20th-century Peruvian people
21st-century Peruvian people